G. W. Watson was a member of the Arkansas Legislature in 1891. He represented Crittenden County, Arkansas. He was included in a photo montage of African American state legislators serving in Arkansas in 1891 published in the Indianapolis Freeman newspaper in Indianapolis.

He was born in 1861 near Holly Springs, Mississippi. He eventually moved to Hopefield, Arkansas.

References

African-American state legislators in Arkansas
1861 births
Year of death missing